The 1945 Copa Ramírez Final (also named Campeonato de la República) was the final match to decide the winner of the Copa General Pedro Ramírez, the 3rd (and last) edition of this Argentine national cup organised by the AFA. The final was contested by Estudiantes de La Plata and Boca Juniors.

Qualified teams

Overview 
The cup was contested by 42 teams. The four Primera División teams that had been semifinalists in the previous editions were automatically entered into the quarter finals, with other clubs from regional leagues having to qualify to play. Teams were divided into four groups (by province), playing each other in a single round-robin tournament.

Four Primera División teams entered directly to quarter finals, of which 2 made it to the finals, Boca Juniors and Estudiantes. Boca Juniors beat Sarmiento de Junín 3–2 and Racing 2-1 at Ferro C. Oeste. Estudiantes defeated Sarmiento de Resistencia 1–0 and Estudiantes de Santiago del Estero 3–1.

The final was played at San Lorenzo de Almagro's venue in Boedo on March 24, 1945. With 15 minutes left, Boca Juniors lead 3–1, but Estudiantes fought back and scored 3 goals within 5 minutes. With only one minute left to play, Jaime Sarlanga scored one last goal, and the game finished in a 4–4 draw. With no winner after extra time, a tiebreaker was scheduled. The match was played on December 18, 1945 in the same venue. Estudiantes won 1–0 after the match was suspended in the 83rd minute. Manuel Pelegrina was also the top goalscorer for Estudiantes, having scored 4 goals in the series, including the winning goal in the tiebreaker match.

Match details

Final 

|

|}

Tiebreaker 

|

|}

References

1945 in Argentine football
r
r
Football in Buenos Aires